Snoop Cube 40 $hort is the debut studio album by American West Coast hip hop supergroup Mount Westmore. It was initially released via blockchain mid-2022 and later released on streaming services on December 9, 2022, through MNRK Music Group, and included unreleased tracks which were not featured on the original version. Production was handled by several record producers, including Rick Rock, Ant Banks, Soopafly and Droop-E. It features a guest appearance from P-Lo.

The album peaked at number 188 on the US Billboard 200. It was supported with two singles: "Big Subwoofer", which previously appeared on 2021 compilation album Snoop Dogg Presents Algorithm, and "Too Big".

At Metacritic, which assigns a normalized rating out of 100 to reviews from mainstream publications, the album received an average score of 66, based on five reviews.

Track listing

Charts

References

External links

   

2022 albums
E-40 albums
Ice Cube albums
Too Short albums
Snoop Dogg albums
Collaborative albums
MNRK Music Group albums
Albums produced by Rick Rock